The Americas Zone was one of three zones of regional competition in the 2006 Fed Cup.

Group I
Venue: Club Campestre de Medellín, Medellín, Colombia (outdoor clay) 
Date: 19–22 April

The eight teams were divided into two pools of four teams. The teams that finished first in the pools played-off to determine which team would partake in the World Group II Play-offs. The four nations coming last or second-to-last in the pools also played-off to determine which would be relegated to Group II for 2007.

Pools

Play-offs

  advanced to 2006 World Group II Play-offs.

Group II
Venue: Parque del Este, Santo Domingo, Dominican Republic (outdoor hard) 
Date: 17–20 April

The six teams were divided into two pools of three teams. The teams that finished first and second in the pools played-off to determine which team would advance to Group I for 2007.

Pools

Play-offs

  and  advanced to Group I for 2007.

See also
Fed Cup structure

References

 Fed Cup Profile, Canada
 Fed Cup Profile, Uruguay
 Fed Cup Profile, Puerto Rico
 Fed Cup Profile, Mexico
 Fed Cup Profile, Brazil
 Fed Cup Profile, Cuba
 Fed Cup Profile, Venezuela
 Fed Cup Profile, Bermuda
 Fed Cup Profile, Dominican Republic
 Fed Cup Profile, Bolivia

External links
 Fed Cup website

 
Americas
Sport in Medellín
Tennis tournaments in Colombia
Sport in Santo Domingo
Tennis tournaments in the Dominican Republic
2006 in Colombian tennis